Dame Melinda Veronica Simmons  (born 1966) is a British diplomat, who serves as Ambassador of the United Kingdom in Ukraine since 2019.

Early life and education
Simmons, who is of Polish, Lithuanian and Ukrainian heritage, was born to Jewish parents in the East End of London. She was educated at the City of London School for Girls, before reading Modern Languages (French and German) at the University of Exeter, where she graduated as BA (Hons) in 1988. She then pursued further studies in European Politics at the University of North London, receiving a Master of Arts (MA) degree in 1995. Dame Melinda is a Fellow of the Chartered Institute of Personnel and Development.

Career

From 1990 to 1992, Simmons was Head of International Department/Associate Director at the Register Group (International marketing and advertising research). She then became International Marketing Manager at Primesight International (outdoor advertising) from 1992 to 1994. From 1994 to 1998, she was Public Affairs Officer at International Alert (conflict resolution NGO) and from 1998 onwards she held roles at the Department for International Development (DfID).

From 1998 to 2003, Simmons held various positions including working with businesses to develop an ethical trademark; managing land restitution in the former Soviet Union; developing global policy on conflict prevention and resolution and setting up the Global Conflict Prevention Pool (GCPP), bringing together the Foreign and Commonwealth Office (FCO), Ministry of Defence (MoD) and DfID to collaborate on conflict prevention/resolution programmes in South Asia and the Middle East, becoming Head of the Africa Team, 2500 Unit (2003–05).

From 2005 to 2008, Simmons was head of DfID's Southern Africa office in Pretoria. She then became Deputy Director, Middle East and North Africa (2008–09); Deputy Director, Humanitarian Emergency Response Review (2010–11), then Head of the Europe Department (2011–13).

From 2013 to 2016, Simmons worked at the FCO as Deputy Director of the Conflict Department. She was the Head of the National Security Secretariat (Joint Programme Hub) from 2016 to 2017 and National Security Secretariat Director (Joint Funds Unit) from 2017 to 2018.

After undertaking full-time language training (in Ukrainian) with the FCO from 2018, in 2019, Simmons was appointed British Ambassador to Kyiv, Ukraine. 

She departed Kyiv on 19 February 2022 and finally left Ukraine, under advice, on 7 March 2022 following the Russian invasion, returning to her office at the British Embassy in Kyiv at the end of April 2022.

Honours
Simmons was appointed Dame Commander of the Order of St Michael and St George (DCMG) in the 2023 New Year Honours for services to British foreign policy.

References

1966 births
Living people
People educated at the City of London School for Girls
Alumni of the University of Exeter
Alumni of the University of North London
Diplomats from London
British women ambassadors
English people of Ukrainian-Jewish descent
English people of Lithuanian-Jewish descent
English people of Polish-Jewish descent
21st-century British Jews
20th-century British Jews
Ambassadors of the United Kingdom to Ukraine
Jewish women
Dames Commander of the Order of St Michael and St George